Xu Junchao (born 22 September 1988) is a Chinese former professional tennis player.

Xu qualified for the main draw of the 2008 China Open, an ATP Tour tournament in Beijing, losing in the first round to Lu Yen-hsun. He represented China at the 2011 Summer Universiade.

ITF Futures titles

Singles: (1)

Doubles: (2)

References

External links
 
 

1988 births
Living people
Chinese male tennis players
Competitors at the 2011 Summer Universiade
21st-century Chinese people